Elvira Bayakhmetovna Berend ( Sakhatova, born 19 September 1965) is a Kazakhstan-born Luxembourg chess player who holds the FIDE title of Woman Grandmaster (WGM). She is a three-time Luxembourg Chess Championship winner (1998, 2015, 2016) and four-time World Women's Over 50 Chess Championship winner (2017, 2018, 2019, 2022).

Biography
She is the younger sister of WIM Gulnar Sachs (née Sakhatova). In 1988, she took part in the USSR Women's Chess Championship final and ranked 12th place. She twice represented the Kazakh SSR team in the Soviet Team Chess Championships (1986, 1991), in which she won team silver medal in 1991.
After dissolution of the Soviet Union in chess tournaments she represented Kazakhstan. In 1995, Elvira Berend participated in Women's World Chess Championship Interzonal Tournament in Chişinău where ranked 14th place. In 1997, in Athens she wins European Women's Fast Chess Championship, as well as winning the international chess tournament in Luxembourg City.
In the second half of the 1990s, she married the Luxembourg International Master Fred Berend, and since 1997 she has been representing Luxembourg in the chess tournaments. 

Elvira Berend played for Kazakhstan and Luxembourg:
 in Women's Chess Olympiads participated 5 times (1992–1996, 2004, 2008) and won individual bronze medal;
 in Men's Chess Olympiad participated in 2014;
 in European Men's Team Chess Championship participated in 2005;
 in Women's Asian Team Chess Championship participated in 1995 and won team bronze and individual silver medals.

In 1995, she became the first female chess player in Kazakhstan to receive the FIDE Woman Grandmaster (WGM) title.

As of July 2022, Berend is the second highest-rated player representing Luxembourg, behind IM Michael Wiedenkeller.

References

External links
 
 
 
 
 

1965 births
Living people
Sportspeople from Almaty
Kazakhstani female chess players
Soviet female chess players
Luxembourgian chess players
Chess woman grandmasters
Chess Olympiad competitors